Herman Pythias Dunlap (March 10, 1908 – May 15, 1978) was an American Negro league outfielder in the 1930s.

A native of Stonewall, Mississippi, Dunlap made his Negro leagues debut in 1936 with the Chicago American Giants, and was selected as a rookie to represent Chicago in the East–West All-Star Game. He played two more seasons for the club through 1938. Dunlap died in Los Angeles, California in 1978 at age 70.

References

External links
 and Seamheads

1908 births
1978 deaths
Chicago American Giants players
Baseball outfielders
Baseball players from Mississippi
People from Clarke County, Mississippi
20th-century African-American sportspeople